Sir Tom Stoppard  (born , 3 July 1937) is a Czech-born British playwright and screenwriter. He has written for film, radio, stage, and television, finding prominence with plays. His work covers the themes of human rights, censorship, and political freedom, often delving into the deeper philosophical thematics of society. Stoppard has been a playwright of the National Theatre and is one of the most internationally performed dramatists of his generation. Stoppard was knighted for his contribution to theatre by Queen Elizabeth II in 1997.

Born in Czechoslovakia, Stoppard left as a child refugee, fleeing imminent Nazi occupation. He settled with his family in Britain after the war, in 1946, having spent the previous three years (1943–1946) in a boarding school in Darjeeling in the Indian Himalayas. After being educated at schools in Nottingham and Yorkshire, Stoppard became a journalist, a drama critic and then, in 1960, a playwright.

Stoppard's most prominent plays include Rosencrantz and Guildenstern Are Dead, Jumpers, Travesties, Night and Day, The Real Thing, Arcadia, The Invention of Love, The Coast of Utopia, Rock 'n' Roll and Leopoldstadt.
Stoppard is also known for his screenplays including Brazil (1985), Empire of the Sun (1987), The Russia House (1990), Billy Bathgate (1991), Shakespeare in Love (1998), Enigma (2001), and Anna Karenina (2012). His work on television includes various plays for ITV Play of the Week and the HBO limited series Parade's End (2013). He directed the film Rosencrantz and Guildenstern Are Dead, with Gary Oldman and Tim Roth as the leads.

He has received numerous awards and honours including an Academy Award, a Laurence Olivier Award, and four Tony Awards. In 2008, The Daily Telegraph ranked him number 11 in their list of the "100 most powerful people in British culture". It was announced in June 2019 that Stoppard had written a new play, Leopoldstadt, set in the Jewish community of early 20th-century Vienna. The play premiered in January 2020 at Wyndham's Theatre. The play went on to win the Laurence Olivier Award for Best New Play.

Early life and education 
Stoppard was born Tomáš Sträussler, in Zlín, a city dominated by the shoe manufacturing industry, in the Moravia region of Czechoslovakia. He is the son of Martha Becková and Eugen Sträussler, a doctor employed by the Bata shoe company. His parents were non-observant Jews.  Just before the German occupation of Czechoslovakia, the town's patron, Jan Antonín Baťa, transferred his Jewish employees, mostly physicians, to branches of his firm outside Europe. On 15 March 1939, the day the Nazis invaded Czechoslovakia, the Sträussler family fled to Singapore, where Bata had a factory.

Before the Japanese occupation of Singapore, Stoppard, his brother, and their mother fled to India. Stoppard's father remained in Singapore as a British army volunteer, knowing that as a doctor, he would be needed in its defense. When Stoppard was four years old, his father died. The writer long understood that Sträussler had perished in Japanese captivity, as a prisoner of war. The book Tom Stoppard in Conversation describes this, but the author later revealed the subsequent discovery that his father had been reported drowned on board a ship, bombed by Japanese forces, as he tried to flee Singapore in 1942.

In 1941, when Tomáš was five, he, his brother, and their mother had been evacuated to Darjeeling, India. The boys attended Mount Hermon School, an American multi-racial school, where Tomáš became Tom and his brother Petr became Peter.

In 1945, his mother, Martha, married British army major Kenneth Stoppard, who gave the boys his English surname and moved the family to England in 1946. Stoppard's stepfather believed strongly that "to be born an Englishman was to have drawn first prize in the lottery of life"—a quote from Cecil Rhodes—telling his 9-year-old stepson: "Don't you realize that I made you British?" setting up Stoppard's desire as a child to become "an honorary Englishman." He has said, "I fairly often find I'm with people who forget I don't quite belong in the world we're in. I find I put a foot wrong—it could be pronunciation, an arcane bit of English history—and suddenly I'm there naked, as someone with a pass, a press ticket." This is reflected in his characters, he observes, who are "constantly being addressed by the wrong name, with jokes and false trails to do with the confusion of having two names." Stoppard attended the Dolphin School in Nottinghamshire, and later completed his education at Pocklington School in East Riding, Yorkshire, which he hated.

Stoppard left school at 17 and began work as a journalist for the Western Daily Press in Bristol, without attending university. Years later, he came to regret the decision to forego a university education, but at the time, he loved his work as a journalist and was passionate about his career. He worked at the paper from 1954 until 1958, when the Bristol Evening World offered Stoppard the position of feature writer, humor columnist, and secondary drama critic, which took him into the world of theater. At the Bristol Old Vic, at the time a well-regarded regional repertory company, Stoppard formed friendships with director John Boorman and actor Peter O'Toole early in their careers. In Bristol, he became known more for his strained attempts at humor and unstylish clothes than for his writing.

Career

Early work 
Stoppard wrote short radio plays in 1953–54 and by 1960 he had completed his first stage play, A Walk on the Water, which was later re-titled Enter a Free Man (1968).
He has said the work owed much to Robert Bolt's Flowering Cherry and Arthur Miller's Death of a Salesman. Within a week after sending A Walk on the Water to an agent, Stoppard received his version of the "Hollywood-style telegrams that change struggling young artists' lives." His first play was optioned, staged in Hamburg, then broadcast on British Independent Television in 1963. From September 1962 until April 1963, Stoppard worked in London as a drama critic for Scene magazine, writing reviews and interviews both under his name and the pseudonym William Boot (taken from Evelyn Waugh's Scoop). In 1964, a Ford Foundation grant enabled Stoppard to spend 5 months writing in a Berlin mansion, emerging with a one-act play titled Rosencrantz and Guildenstern Meet King Lear, which later evolved into his Tony-winning play Rosencrantz and Guildenstern Are Dead.

In the following years, Stoppard produced several works for radio, television and the theatre, including "M" is for Moon Among Other Things (1964), A Separate Peace (1966) and If You're Glad I'll Be Frank (1966). On 11 April 1967 – following acclaim at the 1966 Edinburgh Festival – the opening of Rosencrantz and Guildenstern Are Dead in a National Theatre production at the Old Vic made Stoppard an overnight success. Jumpers (1972) places a professor of moral philosophy in a murder mystery thriller alongside a slew of radical gymnasts. Travesties (1974) explored the 'Wildean' possibilities arising from the fact that Vladimir Lenin, James Joyce, and Tristan Tzara had all been in Zürich during the First World War.
Stoppard has written one novel, Lord Malquist and Mr Moon (1966), set in contemporary London. Its cast includes the 18th-century figure of the dandified Malquist and his ineffectual Boswell, Moon, and also cowboys, a lion (banned from the Ritz) and a donkey-borne Irishman claiming to be the Risen Christ.

1980s 
In the 1980s, in addition to writing his own works, Stoppard translated many plays into English, including works by Sławomir Mrożek, Johann Nestroy, Arthur Schnitzler, and Václav Havel. It was at this time that Stoppard became influenced by the works of Polish and Czech absurdists. He has been co-opted into the Outrapo group, a far-from-serious French movement to improve actors' stage technique through science.

In 1982 Stoppard premiered his play The Real Thing. The story revolves around a male-female relationship and the struggle between the  actress and the member of a group fighting to free a Scottish soldier imprisoned for burning a memorial wreath during a protest. The leading roles were originated by Roger Rees, and Felicity Kendal. The story examines various constructs of honesty including a play within a play, to explore the theme of reality versus appearance. It has been described as one of Stoppard's "most popular, enduring and autobiographical plays."

The play made its Broadway transfer in 1984 which was directed by Mike Nichols starring Jeremy Irons and Glenn Close in the leading roles with a supporting role by Christine Baranski. The transfer was a critical success with The New York Times theatre critic Frank Rich declaring, "The Broadway version of The Real Thing - a substantial revision of the original London production - is not only Mr. Stoppard's most moving play, but also the most bracing play that anyone has written about love and marriage in years." The production went on to earn a seven Tony Award nominations winning five awards for Best Play as well for Nichols, Irons, Close, and Baranski. This would be Stoppard's third Tony Award for Best Play following, Rosencrantz and Guildenstern Are Dead in 1968, and Travesties in 1976.

In 1985, Stoppard co-wrote with Terry Gilliam and Charles McKeown a feature film, the satirical science-fiction dark comedy Brazil (1985). 
The film received near universal acclaim. Pauline Kael critic for The New Yorker declared, "Visually, it’s an original, bravura piece of moviemaking...Gilliam’s vision is an organic thing on the screen—and that’s a considerable achievement". 
Stoppard along with Gilliam and McKeown were nominated for the Academy Award for Best Original Screenplay losing to Witness. He went on to write the scripts for Steven Spielberg, Empire of the Sun (1987), and Indiana Jones and the Last Crusade (1989). Spielberg later stated that though Stoppard was uncredited for the later of the two, "he was responsible for almost every line of dialogue in the film".

1990s 
In 1993, Stoppard wrote Arcadia, a play in which he explores the interaction between two modern academics and the residents of a Derbyshire country house in the early 19th century, including aristocrats, tutors and the fleeting presence, unseen on stage, of Lord Byron. The themes of the play include the philosophical implications of the second law of thermodynamics, Romantic literature, and the English picturesque style of garden design.

The first production premiered at the Royal National Theatre directed by Trevor Nunn starring Rufus Sewell, Felicity Kendal, Bill Nighy, and Harriet Walter. It won the 1993 Laurence Olivier Award for Best New Play. A year later the play made its transfer on Broadway starring Billy Crudup, Blair Brown, Victor Garber and Robert Sean Leonard. The production was well received with Vincent Canby of The New York Times writing, that while "There are real difficulties with this production...[there are] also great pleasures, not the least of which are Mark Thompson's sets and costumes. Mostly, though, there are Mr. Stoppard's grandly eclectic obsessions and his singular gifts as a playwright. Attend to them." The production received three Tony Award nominations including Best Play losing to Terrence McNally's Love! Valour! Compassion!.

Stoppard gained acclaim with the feature film Shakespeare in Love (1998) which he wrote. The film, a romantic comedy, focuses on the fictional life of William Shakespeare and his romance with a young woman who is an inspiration for the play, Romeo and Juliet. The film starred an ensemble cast including Joseph Fiennes, Gwyneth Paltrow, Geoffrey Rush, Colin Firth, and Dame Judi Dench. The film was a critical and financial success and went on to earn seven Academy Awards including Best Picture. Stoppard received his second career Oscar nomination and first win for Best Original Screenplay. He also received the BAFTA Award, and Golden Globe Award for his screenplay.

2000s 
The Coast of Utopia (2002) was a trilogy of plays Stoppard wrote about the philosophical arguments among Russian revolutionary figures in the late 19th century. The trilogy comprises Voyage, Shipwreck, and Salvage. Major figures in the play include Michael Bakunin, Ivan Turgenev, and Alexander Herzen. The title comes from a chapter in Avrahm Yarmolinsky's book Road to Revolution: A Century of Russian Radicalism (1959). The play premiered in 2002 at the National Theatre directed by Trevor Nunn in total spanning nine hours. The play received three Laurence Olivier Award nominations including Best New Play, ultimately losing in all its categories. In 2006 it made its Broadway premiere in a production starring Billy Crudup, Jennifer Ehle, and Ethan Hawke. The play received 10 nominations winning seven awards including for Best Play, Stoppard's fourth win in the category.

Rock 'n' Roll (2006) was set in both Cambridge, England, and Prague. The play explored the culture of 1960s rock music, especially the persona of Syd Barrett and the political challenge of the Czech band The Plastic People of the Universe, mirroring the contrast between liberal society in England and the repressive Czech state after the Warsaw Pact intervention in the Prague Spring.

Stoppard served on the advisory board of the magazine Standpoint, and was instrumental in its foundation, giving the opening speech at its launch. He is also a patron of the Shakespeare Schools Festival, a charity that enables school children across the UK to perform Shakespeare in professional theatres. Stoppard was appointed president of the London Library in 2002 and vice-president in 2017 following the election of Sir Tim Rice as president.

2010s 
For Joe Wright, Stoppard adapted Leo Tolstoy's Anna Karenina into the 2012 film adaptation starring Keira Knightley. Film critic Lisa Schwarzbaum for Entertainment Weekly praised the film and Stoppard writing, "Stoppard — himself a master of puzzle-like construction in fine plays including Arcadia — supplies an excellently clean, delicately balanced script."

In 2013, Stoppard wrote a five part limited series Parade's End which revolves around a love triangle between a conservative English aristocrat, his mean socialite wife and a young suffragette. The series stars Benedict Cumberbatch and Rebecca Hall. The series has received widespread acclaim from critics with The Independents Grace Dent proclaiming it "one of the finest things the BBC has ever made". IndieWire declared, "Parade’s End is wonderful accomplishment, smart, adult television". Stoppard received a British Academy Television Award and Primetime Emmy Award nomination for the series.

It was announced in June 2019 that Stoppard had written a new play, Leopoldstadt, set in the Jewish community of early 20th-century Vienna. The play premiered in January 2020 at Wyndham's Theatre. The play went on to win the Laurence Olivier Award for Best New Play. The play then transferred to Broadway, opening on 2 October 2022.

Screenwriting 
Stoppard has also co-written screenplays including Shakespeare in Love (1998) and Indiana Jones and the Last Crusade (1989). Steven Spielberg states that though Stoppard was uncredited for the latter, "he was responsible for almost every line of dialogue in the film". Stoppard also worked on Star Wars: Episode III – Revenge of the Sith, though again Stoppard received no official or formal credit in this role. He worked in a similar capacity with Tim Burton on his film Sleepy Hollow. His radio production, Darkside (2013), was written for BBC Radio 2 to celebrate the 40th anniversary of Pink Floyd's album The Dark Side of the Moon.

Themes

Existentialism 
Rosencrantz and Guildenstern Are Dead (1966–67) was Stoppard's first major play to gain recognition. The story of Hamlet as told from the viewpoint of two courtiers echoes Beckett in its double act repartee, existential themes and language play. "Stoppardian" became a term describing works using wit and comedy while addressing philosophical concepts. Critic Dennis Kennedy commented: "It established several characteristics of Stoppard's dramaturgy: his word-playing intellectuality, audacious, paradoxical, and self-conscious theatricality, and preference for reworking pre-existing narratives... Stoppard's plays have been sometimes dismissed as pieces of clever showmanship, lacking in substance, social commitment, or emotional weight. His theatrical surfaces serve to conceal rather than reveal their author's views, and his fondness for towers of paradox spirals away from social comment. This is seen most clearly in his comedies The Real Inspector Hound (1968) and After Magritte (1970), which create their humour through highly formal devices of reframing and juxtaposition."  Stoppard himself went so far as to declare  "I must stop compromising my plays with this whiff of social application. They must be entirely untouched by any suspicion of usefulness." He acknowledges that he started off "as a language nerd", primarily enjoying linguistic and ideological playfulness, feeling early in his career that journalism was far better suited for presaging political change, than playwriting.

Intellectuality 
The accusations of favouring intellectuality over political commitment or commentary were met with a change of tack, as Stoppard produced increasingly socially engaged work. From 1977, he became personally involved with human-rights issues, in particular with the situation of political dissidents in Central and Eastern Europe. In February 1977, he visited the Soviet Union and several Eastern European countries with a member of Amnesty International. In June, Stoppard met Vladimir Bukovsky in London and travelled to Czechoslovakia (then under communist control), where he met dissident playwright and future president Václav Havel, whose writing he greatly admires. Stoppard became involved with Index on Censorship, Amnesty International, and the Committee Against Psychiatric Abuse and wrote various newspaper articles and letters about human rights. He was instrumental in translating Havel's works into English. Every Good Boy Deserves Favour (1977), "a play for actors and orchestra" was based on a request by conductor/composer André Previn and was inspired by a meeting with a Russian exile. This play, as well as Dogg's Hamlet, Cahoot's Macbeth (1979), The Coast of Utopia (2002),  Rock 'n' Roll (2006), and two works for television Professional Foul (1977) and Squaring the Circle (1984), all concern themes of censorship, rights abuses, and state repression.

Stoppard's later works have sought greater inter-personal depths, whilst maintaining their intellectual playfulness. Stoppard acknowledges that around 1982 he moved away from the "argumentative" works and more towards plays of the heart, as he became "less shy" about emotional openness. Discussing the later integration of heart and mind in his work, he commented "I think I was too concerned when I set off, to have a firework go off every few seconds... I think I was always looking for the entertainer in myself and I seem to be able to entertain through manipulating language... [but] it's really about human beings, it's not really about language at all." The Real Thing (1982) uses a meta-theatrical structure to explore the suffering that adultery can produce and The Invention of Love (1997) also investigates the pain of passion. Arcadia (1993) explores the meeting of chaos theory, historiography, and landscape gardening. He was inspired by a Trevor Nunn production of Gorky's Summerfolk to write a trilogy of "human" plays: The Coast of Utopia (Voyage, Shipwreck, and Salvage, 2002).

Stoppard has commented that he loves the medium of theatre for how "adjustable" it is at every point, how unfrozen it is, continuously growing and developing through each rehearsal, free from the text. His experience of writing for film is similar, offering the liberating opportunity to "play God", in control of creative reality. It often takes four to five years from the first idea of a play to staging, taking pains to be as profoundly accurate in his research as he can be.

Personal life

Family and relationships 
Stoppard has been married three times. His first marriage was to Josie Ingle (1965–1972), a nurse; his second marriage was to Miriam Stern (1972–92). They separated when he began a relationship with actress Felicity Kendal. He also had a relationship with actress Sinéad Cusack, but she made it clear she wished to remain married to Jeremy Irons and stay close to their two sons. Also, after she was reunited with a son she had given up for adoption, she wished to spend time with him in Dublin rather than with Stoppard in the house they shared in France. He has two sons from each of his first two marriages: Oliver Stoppard, Barnaby Stoppard, the actor Ed Stoppard, and Will Stoppard, who is married to violinist Linzi Stoppard. In 2014 he married Sabrina Guinness.

Stoppard's mother died in 1996. The family had not talked about their history and neither brother knew what had happened to the family left behind in Czechoslovakia. In the early 1990s, with the fall of communism, Stoppard found out that all four of his grandparents had been Jewish and had died in Terezin, Auschwitz, and other camps, along with three of his mother's sisters.

In 1998, following the deaths of his parents, he returned to Zlín for the first time in over 50 years. He has expressed grief both for a lost father and a missing past, but he has no sense of being a survivor, at whatever remove. "I feel incredibly lucky not to have had to survive or die. It's a conspicuous part of what might be termed a charmed life."

In 2013, Stoppard asked Hermione Lee to write his biography. The book was published in 2020.

Political views
In 1979, the year of Margaret Thatcher's election, Stoppard noted to Paul Delaney: "I'm a conservative with a small c. I am a conservative in politics, literature, education and theatre." In 2007, Stoppard described himself as a "timid libertarian".

The Tom Stoppard Prize was created in 1983 under the Charter 77 Foundation and is awarded to authors of Czech origin.

With Kevin Spacey, Jude Law, and others, Stoppard joined protests against the regime of Alexander Lukashenko in March 2011, showing their support for the Belarusian democracy movement.

In 2014, Stoppard publicly backed "Hacked Off" and its campaign towards press self-regulation by "safeguarding the press from political interference while also giving vital protection to the vulnerable."

Legacy and honours

Awards 

In July 2013 Stoppard was awarded the PEN Pinter Prize for "determination to tell things as they are."

In July 2017, Stoppard was elected an Honorary Fellow of the British Academy (HonFBA), the United Kingdom's national academy for the humanities and social sciences. Stoppard was appointed Cameron Mackintosh Visiting Professor of Contemporary Theatre, St Catherine's College, Oxford, for the academic year 2017–2018.

Stoppard has been represented in various forms of art. He sat for sculptor Alan Thornhill, and a bronze head is now in public collection, situated with the Stoppard papers in the reading room of the Harry Ransom Center at the University of Texas at Austin. The terracotta remains in the collection of the artist in London. The correspondence file relating to the Stoppard bust is held in the archive of the Henry Moore Foundation's Henry Moore Institute in Leeds.

Stoppard also sat for the sculptor and friend Angela Conner, and his bronze portrait bust is on display in the grounds of Chatsworth House.

Archive

The papers of Stoppard are housed at the Harry Ransom Center at the University of Texas at Austin. The archive was first established by Stoppard in 1991 and continues to grow. The collection consists of typescript and handwritten drafts, revision pages, outlines, and notes; production material, including cast lists, set drawings, schedules, and photographs; theatre programs; posters; advertisements; clippings; page and galley proofs; dust jackets; correspondence; legal documents and financial papers, including passports, contracts, and royalty and account statements; itineraries; appointment books and diary sheets; photographs; sheet music; sound recordings; a scrapbook; artwork; minutes of meetings; and publications.

Published works
Novel
 1966: Lord Malquist and Mr Moon

Theatre
 1964: A Walk on the Water
 1965: The Gamblers - based on the novel The Gambler by Dostoevsky
 1966: Tango - adapted from Sławomir Mrożek's play and Nicholas Bethell translation, premiered at the Aldwych Theatre
 1966: Rosencrantz and Guildenstern Are Dead
 1968: Enter a Free Man - developed from  A Walk on the Water
 1968: The Real Inspector Hound
 1969: Albert's Bridge - premiered at St. Mary's Hall in Edinburgh
 1969: If You're Glad I'll Be Frank - premiered at St Mary's Hall in Edinburgh
 1970: After Magritte - frequently performed as a companion piece to The Real Inspector Hound
 1971: Dogg's Our Pet - premiered at the Almost Free Theatre
 1972: Jumpers
 1972: Artist Descending a Staircase
 1974: Travesties
 1976: Dirty Linen and New-Found-Land - first performed on 6 April 1976
 1976: 15-Minute Hamlet
 1977: Every Good Boy Deserves Favour - written at the request of André Previn (the play calls for a full orchestra)
 1978: Night and Day
 1979: Dogg's Hamlet, Cahoot's Macbeth – two plays written to be performed together
 1979: Undiscovered Country – an adaptation of Das Weite Land by the Austrian playwright Arthur Schnitzler
 1981: On the Razzle - based on Einen Jux will er sich machen by Johann Nestroy
 1982: The Real Thing
 1982: The (15 Minute) Dogg's Troupe Hamlet - revision of 1979 play, Stoppard's contribution to eight one-act plays by eight playwrights performed as Pieces of Eight
 1983: English libretto for The Love for Three Oranges (original opera by Sergei Prokofiev)
 1984: Rough Crossing - based on Play at the Castle by Ferenc Molnár
 1986: Dalliance - an adaptation of Arthur Schnitzler's Liebelei
 1987: Largo Desolato - a translation of a play by Václav Havel
 1988: Hapgood
 1993: Arcadia
 1995: Indian Ink – based on Stoppard's radio play In the Native State
 1997: The Invention of Love
 1997: The Seagull – a translation of the play by Anton Chekhov
 2002: The Coast of Utopia - a trilogy of plays: Voyage, Shipwreck, and Salvage
 2004: Enrico IV (Henry IV) – a translation of the Italian play by Luigi Pirandello First presented at the Donmar Theatre, London, in April 2004.
 2006: Rock 'n' Roll  – First public performance 3 June 2006 preview at the Royal Court Theatre.
 2010: The Laws of War – a contribution to a collaborative piece for a one-night benefit performance in support of Human Rights Watch
 2015: The Hard Problem
 2020: Leopoldstadt

Original works for radio
 1964: The Dissolution of Dominic Boot
 1964: 'M' is for Moon Amongst Other Things
 1966: If You're Glad I'll be Frank
 1967: Albert's Bridge
 1968: Where Are They Now? - written for school radio
 1972: Artist Descending a Staircase
 1982: The Dog It Was That Died
 1991: In the Native State - later expanded to become the stage play Indian Ink (1995).
 2007: On Dover Beach
 2012: Albert's Bridge, Artist Descending a Staircase, The Dog It Was That Died, and In the Native State have been published by the British Library as Tom Stoppard Radio Plays
 2013: Darkside - written for BBC Radio 2

Television plays
 A Separate Peace transmitted August 1966
 Teeth
 Another Moon Called Earth (containing some dialogue and situations later incorporated into Jumpers)
 Neutral Ground (a loose adaptation of Sophocles' Philoctetes)
 Professional Foul
 Squaring the Circle
 1970: The Engagement, a television version of The Dissolution of Dominic Boot on NBC Experiment in Television

Film and television adaptation of plays and books
 1975: Three Men in a Boat adaptation of Jerome K. Jerome's novel for BBC Television
 1975: The Boundary co-authored by Clive Exton, for the BBC
 1978: Despair – screenplay for the film directed by Rainer Werner Fassbinder, starring Dirk Bogarde, based on the novel by Vladimir Nabokov
 1979: The Human Factor — a film adaption of the novel by Graham Greene
 1985: Brazil co-authored with Terry Gilliam and Charles McKeown, script nominated for an Academy Award
 1987: Empire of the Sun first draft of the screenplay
 1989: Indiana Jones and the Last Crusade final rewrite of Jeffrey Boam's rewrite of Menno Meyjes's screenplay
 1990: The Russia House screenplay for the 1990 film of the John le Carré novel
 1990: Rosencrantz & Guildenstern are Dead – won the Golden Lion and which he also directed
 1998: Shakespeare in Love co-authored with Marc Norman; script won an Academy Award
 1998: Poodle Springs teleplay adaptation of the novel by Robert B. Parker and Raymond Chandler
 2001: Enigma film screenplay of the Robert Harris novel
 2005: Star Wars: Episode III – Revenge of the Sith dialogue-polish of George Lucas's screenplay
 2005: The Golden Compass a draft screenplay, not produced
 2012: Parade's End, television screenplay for BBC/HBO of Ford Madox Ford's series of novels
 2012: Anna Karenina, film screenplay of the Leo Tolstoy novel
 2014: Tulip Fever, film screenplay of the Deborah Moggach novel

References

Sources

Further reading
 Bloom, Harold, ed. Tom Stoppard. Bloom's Major Dramatists series. New York: Chelsea House, 2003, .
 Cahn, Victor L. Beyond Absurdity: The Plays of Tom Stoppard. Madison, N.J.: Fairleigh Dickinson University Press, 1979.
 Corballis, Richard. Stoppard. The Mystery and the Clockwork Oxford, New York, 1984.
 Delaney, Paul. Tom Stoppard: The Moral Vision of the Plays London, Basingstoke: Macmillan, 1990.
 Fleming, John. Stoppard's Theater: Finding Order Amid Chaos Austin: University of Texas Press, 2001.
 Hunter, Jim. About Stoppard: The Playwright and the Work. London: Faber and Faber, 2005.
 Londré, Felicia Hardison. Tom Stoppard Modern Literature Series. New York: Frederick Ungar Publishing Co., 1981.
 Purse, Nigel. Tom Stoppard's Plays. Patterns of Plenitude and Parsimony. Leiden: Brill, 2016.
 Stoppard, Tom & Delaney, Paul (eds). Tom Stoppard in Conversation University of Michigan Press, 1994.
 Südkamp, Holger. Tom Stoppard's Biographical Drama. Trier: WVT, 2008.

External links

 Bibliography at Open Library
  at the British Film Institute
 A Tom Stoppard Bibliography. Retrieved 13 August 2020.
 Tom Stoppard Papers and the Robert May Collection of Tom Stoppard at the Harry Ransom Center, University of Texas at Austin
 
 British Council profile Retrieved 9 May 2020.
 BBC John Tusa Interview (Audio 43 mins). With transcript. BBC profile. Retrieved 2 January 2011.
 
 
 Guppy, Shusha (Winter 1988). "Tom Stoppard, The Art of Theater No. 7", Paris Review interview
 
 Stoppard talking about his life on BBC Radio 4's Front Row in April 2017

1937 births
Living people
20th-century British dramatists and playwrights
21st-century British dramatists and playwrights
Best Original Screenplay Academy Award winners
Best Screenplay Golden Globe winners
Campaign Against Psychiatric Abuse
Commanders of the Order of the British Empire
Critics' Circle Theatre Award winners
Czechoslovak emigrants to England
Directors of Golden Lion winners
Drama Desk Award winners
English Jewish writers
English libertarians
English male dramatists and playwrights
English male journalists
English male screenwriters
English people of Czech-Jewish descent
English radio writers
Exophonic writers
Fellows of the Royal Society of Literature
Honorary Fellows of the British Academy
Jewish dramatists and playwrights
Knights Bachelor
Laurence Olivier Award winners
Members of the Order of Merit
Naturalised citizens of the United Kingdom
People educated at Pocklington School
Writers from Bristol
Writers from Zlín
Prix Italia winners
Stoppard family
Theatre of the Absurd
Tony Award winners
Writers Guild of America Award winners
Czech expatriates in India
British expatriates in India